Rineloricaria jubata is a species of catfish in the family Loricariidae. It is native to South America, where it occurs in the basins of the Mira River and the Esmeraldas River in Ecuador. The species reaches 21 cm (8.3 inches) in standard length and is believed to be a facultative air-breather.

References 

Loricariini
Catfish of South America
Fish described in 1902